The Marines Are Here is a 1938 American comedy-drama film, directed by Phil Rosen. It stars Gordon Oliver, June Travis, and Ray Walker, and was released on June 8, 1938.

Cast list
 Gordon Oliver as Jones
 June Travis as Terry
 Ray Walker as Hogan
 Guinn "Big Boy" Williams as Sergeant Gibbons
 Ronnie Cosbey as Tommy
 Billy Dooley as Mugsy
 Pat Gleason as One Step
 Edward Earle as Lieutenant Drake
 Wade Boteler as Sergeant Foster
 Harry Semels

References

External links 
 
 
 

Films directed by Phil Rosen
1938 comedy-drama films
American comedy-drama films
American black-and-white films
Films about the United States Marine Corps
1938 films
Monogram Pictures films
1930s English-language films
1930s American films